Easter Howgate is a settlement in Midlothian, Scotland, UK, on the A702, two miles north of Penicuik.

The Scottish Agricultural College maintains a teaching campus and a research farm there, named "Edinburgh Genetics".

See also
List of places in Midlothian

External links

 PDF document -  Map of the Pentland Hills

Villages in Midlothian